The Roman Catholic Diocese of Shuozhou/Shuoxian is a diocese located in the city of Shuozhou (Shanxi) in the Ecclesiastical province of Taiyuan in China.

History
 July 12, 1926: Established as the Apostolic Prefecture of Shohchow 朔州 from the Apostolic Vicariate of Taiyuanfu 太原府, entrusted to Franciscans from Bavaria. 
 June 17, 1932: Promoted as Apostolic Vicariate of Shohchow 朔州
 April 11, 1946: Promoted as Diocese of Shuozhou 朔州

Leadership
 Bishops of Shuozhou(Roman rite)
 Bishop Paul Ma Cunguo (2007–present)
 Bishop Bonaventure Luo Juan (1990 - 2007)
 Bishop Edgar Anthony Haering, O.F.M. (俞廣仁) (April 11, 1946 – July 25, 1971)
 Vicars Apostolic of Shohchow 朔州 (Roman Rite)
 Bishop Edgar Anthony Haering, O.F.M. (俞廣仁) (1933.04.25 – 1946.04.11)
 Prefects Apostolic of Shohchow 朔州 (Roman Rite)
 Fr. Edgar Anthony Haering, O.F.M. (俞廣仁) (later Bishop) (1927.07.13 – 1932.06.17)

References

 GCatholic.org
 Catholic Hierarchy

Roman Catholic dioceses in China
Christian organizations established in 1926
Roman Catholic dioceses and prelatures established in the 20th century
Religion in Shanxi
Shuozhou